Robert Royce Usher (March 1, 1925 – December 29, 2014) was a Major League Baseball outfielder who played in parts of six seasons, appearing first for the Cincinnati Reds during 1946 and 1947, then in 1950 and 1951. He also played for the Chicago Cubs in 1952, and the Cleveland Indians and Washington Senators in 1957.

Biography
Usher was signed as a free agent by the Reds prior to the 1943 season, making his debut on April 16, 1946 following naval service in World War II.

References

External links

1925 births
2014 deaths
Cincinnati Reds players
Chicago Cubs players
Cleveland Indians players
Washington Senators (1901–1960) players
Major League Baseball outfielders
Baseball players from San Diego
Birmingham Barons players
Rochester Red Wings players
Tulsa Oilers (baseball) players
Syracuse Chiefs players
Syracuse Orangemen baseball players
Miami RedHawks baseball players
Los Angeles Angels (minor league) players
San Diego Padres (minor league) players
Miami Marlins (IL) players
United States Navy personnel of World War II